Meydan-e Azadi Metro Station is the sixteenth station of the Tehran Metro Line 4 and is located in Azadi Square, Shaheed Baradaran Rahmani Highway, between Ostad Moein and before Bimeh.

References

Tehran Metro stations